Hopewell Presbyterian Church is a historic Presbyterian church located in Franklin Township, Johnson County, Indiana, United States. It was built in 1902, and is a two-story, Gothic Revival style Akron Plan design church. It is topped by an octagonal dome and features pointed arches, crenelation, and steeply pitched roof. A one-story hip roofed addition was built in 1927, and another one-story addition in 1958.

It was listed on the National Register of Historic Places in 2000.

References

External links
church website

Presbyterian churches in Indiana
Churches on the National Register of Historic Places in Indiana
Gothic Revival church buildings in Indiana
Churches completed in 1902
Churches in Johnson County, Indiana
Akron Plan church buildings
National Register of Historic Places in Johnson County, Indiana